Sadikpur or Sadiqpur may refer to:

Places
Sadikpur, Murshidabad, a village in Jangipur subdivision of West Bengal, India
Sadikpur, Siwan, a village in Siwan District of Bihar, India
Sabikpur, Lakhisarai, a village in Lakhisarai district of Bihar state India
Sadiqpur, a village in Shahkot in Jalandhar district of Punjab State, India

Railway
Sadiqpur railway station, located in Pakistan